Mandla is a South African name that may refer to
Mandla Langa (born 1950), South African poet, short story writer, and novelist 
Mandla Mandela (born 1974), South African chief of the Mvezo Traditional Council, grandson of Nelson Mandela
Mandla Masango (born 1989), South African football midfielder 
Mandla Mofokeng (born 1967), South African musician, singer and producer 
Mandla Zwane (born 1973), South African football player 
Edward Mandla (born 1963), Australian politician and businessman